is a railway station in Miyagino-ku in Sendai, Miyagi, Japan operated by East Japan Railway Company (JR East).

Lines
Nakanosakae Station is served by the Senseki Line.

Station layout
The station has two opposed side platforms connected to the station building by a footbridge. The station has a Midori no Madoguchi staffed ticket office.

Platforms

History
Nakanosakae Station opened on　April 1, 1981. The station was absorbed into the JR East network upon the privatization of JNR on April 1, 1987.

Passenger statistics
In fiscal 2018, the station was used by an average of 5,580 passengers daily (boarding passengers only).

Surrounding area
 
Sendai Ikuei Gakuen High School Tagajo Campus
Sendai Sakae Post Office

See also
 List of railway stations in Japan

References

External links

  

Railway stations in Sendai
Senseki Line
Railway stations in Japan opened in 1981
Stations of East Japan Railway Company